Rhetus is a Neotropical metalmark butterfly genus. They are small (wingspan 25–30 mm), fast flying, strikingly iridescent, and have long wing tails. They are found in open areas, including tracks of primary rainforest.

The genus was erected by William John Swainson in 1829.

In older literature, all three species were placed in the genus Diorina Morisse 1838 currently viewed as a subjective junior synonym, the older name having priority.

Rhetus periander often features in butterfly wall displays.

Subspecies
There are three species:
Rhetus arcius (Linnaeus, 1763) – paler than R. periander and with longer thinner tails
Rhetus dysonii (Saunders, 1850) – outer margins of the forewings convex, distinct white bands, and white markings on the tail
Rhetus periander (Cramer, [1777]) – commonest and most widespread

References

 Lamas, G. ed. (2004). Atlas of Neotropical Lepidoptera. Checklist: Part 4A Hesperioidea - Papilionoidea. Gainesville: Scientific Publishers/Association of Tropical Lepidoptera.

Riodinini
Riodinidae of South America
Butterfly genera
Taxa named by William John Swainson